Alappuzha district, is one of the 14 districts in the Indian state of Kerala. It was formed as Alleppey district on 17 August 1957, the name of the district being changed to Alappuzha in 1990, and is the smallest district of Kerala. Alleppey town, the district headquarters, was renamed Alappuzha in 2012, even though the anglicised name is still commonly used to describe the town as well as the district.

A town with canals, backwaters, beaches, and lagoons, Alappuzha was described by George Curzon, the British Governor-General of India in the beginning of the 20th century CE, as the "Venice of the Eastern world." The district is best known for its picturesque Kerala Backwaters, by which it is well connected to other parts of Kerala, including the tourist destination of Kumarakom, the district being a well known tourist destination in India. It is also known for its coir factories, as most of Kerala's coir industries are situated in and around the Alappuzha town.

The Vembanad lake, which lies below the sea level, is the longest lake in the Indian peninsula, and the district of Alappuzha lies between this lake and the Arabian Sea. Kuttanad region of the Alappuzha district, which lies below the sea level, is the point of least elevation in the entire India. Kuttanad, also known as The Rice Bowl of Kerala, has the lowest altitude in India, and is also one of the few places in the world where cultivation takes place below the sea level.

The district was home to the Communist-led Punnapra-Vayalar uprising against the Divan of the British Princely state of Travancore in the 1940s.

History

The present-day town of Alappuzha owes its existence to Raja Kesavadas during the second half of the 18th century CE. However the district of Alappuzha had an important position  in the classical Malayalam literature. Kuttanad, the rice bowl of Kerala, was well known from the early Sangam period itself.

Classical antiquity

History records that the region which now constitutes the modern-day district of Alappuzha had trade relations with the ancient Greece, the ancient Rome, the ancient Levant, the ancient Arabian peninsula, and the Ancient Egypt during the Sangam period in the early centuries of the Common Era.

The ancient port town of Barace which is recorded as an important centre of the Indian Ocean trade in the ancient Greco-Roman travelogues such as the Periplus of the Erythraean Sea (written around 50 CE) is often identified with the modern-day coastal town of Purakkad on the mouth of the Pamba River in the Alappuzha district. This river is also the third-longest river in Kerala only after to the Periyar river and the Bharathappuzha river.

Early members of the Chera dynasty had their home in Kuttanad and were sometimes known as the  Kuttuvans. However the regions south of the Pamba River was ruled by the Ay kingdom during the ancient period. Pamba is mentioned as Baris in the ancient Greco-Roman travelogues. There are archaeological evidences of the early period of this district, including ancient fossils, stone inscriptions and monuments, in the archeological sites like the excavation sites, the caves, the temples, etc. The literary works of the Sangam period also help to take a look into the ancient period of the district.

Alappuzha district was once a prominent centre of Buddhism in South India prior to the arrival of Nambudiri Brahmins into the region. Sri Mulavasam was then a prominent Buddhist pilgrimage centre in the Indian peninsula. Numerous remnants of once flourished Buddhism have been found from the taluks of Ambalappuzha and Mavelikara.

Medieval history
The regions included in the district had a prominent position in the medieval Malayalam literary works such as Unnuneeli Sandesam. One among the famous literary works of this period was the Ascharya Choodamani, a Sanskrit drama written by Sakthibhadra who was a scholar from Chengannur.

The feudal monarch of Chempakasseri was at its zenith during the reign of Pooradam Thirunal Devanarayanan, a great scholar and a poet who was also the author of the literary work Vedantha Ratnamala. It is said that Ambalappuzha Sri Krishna Temple, at Ambalappuzha, was constructed and the idol of Lord Krishna installed during that time. Chempakassery was ruled by Brahmin monarchs during the medieval period.

It is believed that Melpathur Narayana Bhattathiri, Kumaran Namboothiri, and Neelakanta Deekshithar were eminent scholars who patronized his court.

Feudal principalities during the medieval period
The southern regions of the modern-day Alappuzha district once formed part of the erstwhile "kingdom of Odanad" (also known as the "kingdom of Kayamkulam" or known by the name "Onattukara"), which was later invaded by the Travancorean forces in the year 1746. It was a branch of the ancient Ay kingdom. It was also known as the Chirava Swaroopam, where the word Chirava derives from the combination of two Malayalam words, Cheru and Aayi, which means "a smaller branch of the Ay kingdom". It included some parts of the modern-day Taluks of Chengannur, Mavelikara, Karthikappally, and Karunagappally.

The northernmost region of the district, which curresponds to the present-day Taluk of Cherthala, was ruled by the "Kingdom of Karappuram" prior to the 1762 treaty that was signed between the kingdom of Travancore and the Kingdom of Cochin. Karappuram was a tributary of the Kingdom of Cochin until 1762 when it was handed over to the kingdom of Travancore. The headquarters of the "Madathingal branch" of the Cochin Royal family was situated at Madathinkara in Karappuram.

South of Karappuram lied the "Chempakassery kingdom" which was also known by the name the "Kingdom of Purakkad" prior to the Travancorean conquest of 1746. The kingdom of Chempakassery included the modern-day Taluks of Ambalappuzha and Kuttanad. The monarch of Chempakassery was known by the title "Chempakassery Deva Narayanan". Melpathur Narayana Bhattathiri and Kunchan Nambiar, who originally hailed from the South Malabar region, were court poets of the Chempakassery kingdom at times.

Karthikappally was a small feudal kingdom that lied between the feudal kingdoms of Odanad and Chempakassery until the Travancorean invasion of the mid-18th century CE, which curresponds to the modern-day Taluk of Karthikappally. The southernmost portion of the district had been once part of the erstwhile feudal kingdom of Karunagappally, which had been subordinate to the Chirava Swaroopam (Kayamkulam) at times.

Progress and Social Reformation during the Travancore era (1746-1947)

In the 17th century the Portuguese power declined on the Malabar Coast and the Dutch Malabar gained a predominant position in the principalities of this district.  The church located at Kokkamangalam or Kokkothamangalam is believed to be  one of the seven churches founded by St. Thomas the Apostle, one of the twelve disciples of Jesus Christ according to the oral traditions. The picturesque CSI Christ Church in Alappuzha town was built in 1816 by the first CMS (Church Missionary Society) missionary to India, Rev. Thomas Norton. It was the first Anglican Church to be established in the erstwhile state of Travancore.

It was during the mid-18th century CE that the Maharaja Marthanda Varma, popularly known as the ‘Architect of the Modern Travancore’, interfered in the political affairs of the smaller feudal principalities who ruled parts of the district. Marthandavarma Maharaja had a remarkable role in the internal progress of the district. The Krishnapuram Palace, which is now a protected monument of the State Archaeology Department, was constructed during his administrative period. He was known as the "Architect of the Modern Alleppey" and played a key role in making Alappuzha a premier port town of Travancore.

During the reign of Balaramavarma Maharaja, Velu Thampi Dalava took keen interest in the development of the town and the port. He brought whole area of the Pathiramanal island into coconut cultivation and it's larger tracts into paddy cultivation. The role of Velu Thampi Dalava in the development of Alappuzha is worth mentioning. In the 19th century the district attained progress in all spheres.

Kayamkulam Kochunni was a heroic outlaw from Kayamkulam who lived during the 19th century CE. The 19th century social reformer Arattupuzha Velayudha Panicker hails from the modern-day district of Alappuzha.

The first modern factory for the manufacture of Coir mats and mattings was also established in 1859 at Alappuzha. The Alappuzha Town Improvement Committee was set up in 1894. During the Travancorean administration, Cherthala taluk was included in the Northern division (Kottayam division) while rest of the Taluks which together constitute the modern-day district of Alappuzha was placed under the Central division (Kollam division) of the British Princely state of Travancore.

This district played a prominent role in the freedom struggle of Travancore. The campaign for the eradication of Untouchability was organized much earlier in this district by T.K. Madhavan, a journalist and in 1925 the approach roads to the temples, especially to the Ambalappuzha Sree Krishna Swamy Temple, were thrown open to the Hindus of all castes. The district also witnessed the ‘Nivarthana’ movement which was started as a protest against the constitutional repression in 1932. The first political strike in Kerala was held at Alappuzha in 1938. The district was home to the Communist-led Punnapra-Vayalar uprising against the Divan of the British Princely state of Travancore in the 1940s.

Geography

Alappuzha is on a peninsular landmass between the Arabian Sea and the Vembanad lake. Major rivers are the Manimala, the Pamba, and the Achankovil; their branches and tributaries flow through Alappuzha and empty into the Vembanad lake. The most important lake is Vembanad.

Forest and wildlife

Alappuzha was the only district in Kerala without public forest land. But that changed in 2013, when  of land at Veeyapuram was declared as reserved forest by the Forest and Wildlife Department.

Pathiramanal island on the Vembanad lake of Alappuzha district is famous for rare migrating birds.

Administration

Alappuzha city is the administrative headquarters of the Alappuzha district. The district is divided into two revenue divisions-Alappuzha and Chengannur.

Municipal towns

There are 6 municipal towns in the district. They are:

Legislative representation

There are two Lok Sabha constituencies in Alappuzha: Alappuzha and Mavelikara.

There are nine Kerala Legislative Assembly seats in Alappuzha district.

Taluks

The district is divided into two revenue divisions which together incorporate six Taluks within them.

Taluks in the Alappuzha Revenue Division are:

Taluks in the Chengannur Revenue Division are:

Revenue villages
Alappuzha district is divided into 93 revenue villages for the ease and decentralisation of its revenue administration. They are further incorporated into 6 taluks as eludicated below.

Cherthala Taluk

 Arookutty
 Aroor
 Arthunkal
 Cherthala North
 Cherthala South
 Ezhupunna
 Kadakkarappally
 Kanjikuzhy
 Kodamthuruth
 Kokkothamangalam
 Kuthiyathode
 Mararikulam North
 Pallippuram
 Panavally
 Pattanakkad
 Perumbalam
 Thanneermukkom North
 Thanneermukkom South
 Thuravoor South
 Thaikkattussery
 Vayalar East

Ambalappuzha Taluk

 Alappuzha West
 Ambalappuzha
 Ambalappuzha North
 Aryad South
 Kalavoor
 Karumady
 Komalapuram
 Mannancherry
 Mullakkal
 Paravur-Alappuzha
 Pathirappally
 Pazhaveedu
 Punnapra
 Purakkad

Kuttanad Taluk

 Champakulam
 Edathua
 Kainakary North
 Kainakary South
 Kavalam
 Kunnumma
 Muttar
 Nedumudi
 Neelamperoor
 Pulinkunnoo
 Ramankary
 Thakazhy
 Thalavady
 Veliyanad

Karthikappally Taluk

 Arattupuzha
 Cheppad
 Cheruthana
 Chingoli
 Haripad
 Kandalloor
 Karthikappally
 Karuvatta
 Kayamkulam
 Keerikkad
 Krishnapuram
 Kumarapuram
 Muthukulam
 Pallippad
 Pathiyoor
 Puthuppally
 Thrikkunnapuzha
 Veeyapuram

Mavelikara Taluk

 Bharanikkavu
 Chennithala
 Chunakkara
 Kannamangalam
 Kattanam
 Mavelikara
 Nooranad
 Palamel
 Perungala
 Thamarakkulam
 Thazhakkara
 Thekkekara
 Thriperumthura
 Vallikunnam
 Vettiyar

Chengannur Taluk

 Ala
 Chengannur
 Cheriyanad
 Ennakkad
 Kurattissery
 Mannar
 Mulakuzha
 Pandanad
 Puliyoor
 Thiruvanvandoor
 Venmony

List of district collectors
List of Collectors of Alappuzha District according to length of tenure in descending order. The longest serving District Collector of Alappuzha was K. Balakrishna Kurup and the shortest serving District Collector was Sriram Venkitaraman.

K. Balakrishna Kurup served for 1146 days from 2 June 1980 to 23 July 1983, but from July 26, 2022, to August 2, 2022, Sriram Venkitaraman served for only 7 days from 26 July 2022 to 2 August 2022.

Demographics

According to the 2011 census, Alappuzha district has a population of 2,127,789, roughly equal to the nation of Namibia or the US state of New Mexico. This gives it a ranking of 216th in India (out of a total of 640). Its population growth rate over the decade 2001-2011 was 0.88%. Alappuzha has a sex ratio of 1100 females for every 1000 males, and a literacy rate of 95.72%. Scheduled Castes and Scheduled Tribes make up 9.46% and 0.31% of the population respectively.

Malayalam is the predominant language, spoken by 99.00% of the population. There is a small minority of Konkani speakers in urban areas.

It has the highest population density among all districts of the state. It is 29.46% urbanized, and is the smallest district in Kerala.

Religion

In the 2011 Indian Census, the Hindu population is 68.64%, Christian (Orthodox, Marthoma, Pentecostal and Latin Catholic are majority) 20.45, and Muslim 10.55.

Transport

Road

National Highways
National Highway 66 (India) is one of the longest national highways in India. It connects Panvel to Kanyakumari passes through the city and allow to connect other major cities like Mumbai, Udupi, Mangalore, Kannur, Kozhikode, Ernakulam, Kollam, and Trivandrum. The construction of the Alappuzha Bypass, to route the national highway around city centers between Kommady and Kalarkode, is completed; and the highway was opened on 28 January 2021. Alappuzha is also well connected by road. There is a plan to upgrade State Highway 11 (Kerala) to national highway status which helps to connect Alappuzha to Kodaikanal as part of promoting coastal-hill tourism project.

State Highways

There are eight state highways in Alappuzha district and three of them originates from Alappuzha town. State Highway 11 (Kerala) is a state Highway that starts in Kalarcode, Alappuzha and ends in Perunna, Changanassery. The road is popularly known as AC road (Alappuzha Changanassery) road and it has 24.2 km length. It's an important busy road which connects Alappuzha city with Kottayam district.
State Highway 40 (Kerala) is an interstate state highway in Alappuzha district which connects with Alappuzha town to Madurai, Tamil Nadu. It's the only interstate state highway in Alappuzha district. State Highway 66 (Kerala) is a state highway which originates from Alappuzha town and terminates at Thoppumpady, Ernakulam. 

Main Central Road is the arterial State Highway in the Travancore region of Kerala state. It is designated as SH 1 by the Kerala Public Works Department. It passes through Chengannur town of Alappuzha district and helps it to connect with other parts of Kerala. State Highway 5 (Kerala) is another State Highway that starts in Kayamkulam and ends at Pulimukku junction. The highway is 42.5 km long. State Highway 6 (Kerala) starts in Kayamkulam and ends in Thiruvalla. This highway has 30.8 km length. State Highway 10 (Kerala) is a State Highway that starts in Mavelikkara and ends in Kozhencherry. The highway is 28.7 km long. State Highway 12 (Kerala) that starts in Ambalappuzha and ends in Thiruvalla and has 27.2 km length.

Vehicle registration

Following are the vehicle registrations in Alappuzha District:
 KL-04: Alappuzha RTO (Ambalappuzha Taluk)
 KL-29: Kayamkulam SRTO (Karthikappally Taluk)
 KL-30: Chengannur SRTO (Chengannur Taluk)
 KL-31: Mavelikkara SRTO (Mavelikkara Taluk) 
 KL-32: Cherthala SRTO (Cherthala Taluk)
 KL-66: Kuttanad SRTO (Kuttanad Taluk)
SRTO (HARIPPAD)KL 88

Old structure:-
Following are the old registration numbers in Alappuzha District:-
 KLA
 KLY
 KRA
 KRY

Water
The presence of a lot of backwaters and canals makes water transport a common means of transport. National Waterway 3 passes through Alappuzha. There is an SWTD boat jetty in the city that lies opposite to the KSRTC bus stand. It is served by boat services to towns like Kottayam, Kollam and Changanassery besides to other small towns and jetties.

Rail

Alappuzha district has two railway lines. Ernakulam–Kayamkulam coastal railway line primarily links with Haripad railway station, Alappuzha railway station, Cherthala railway station and Kayamkulam Junction railway station, Whereas Ernakulam-Kottayam-Kayamkulam line connects the eastern region of district and that is Chengannur railway station and Mavelikara railway station.

Air

The city is accessible by air, rail, road and water. Thiruvananthapuram International Airport,  to the South, is the other airport that links the district with other countries. International tourists use this facility to reach Alappuzha. The other nearest airports are at Kozhikode and Coimbatore. A helipad in the city is reserved for government uses.

Culture

Snake boat races are the most significant traditional event in Alleppey. These regattas are usually held between August and October, and involve long thin boats powered by up to 120 oarsmen. One such snake boat race is the Nehru Trophy Boat Race.

Chemmeen was filmed in two villages in Alappuzha. In the opening credits, a written statement in Malayalam thanks the people of both villages.

Tourism

The name Alappuzha is derived from Aal (Sea)+ puzha (River-mouth) ("The joining place of a river and the sea") (Malayalam). Alappuzha is one of the most important tourist centres in the state, with a large network of inland canals, earning it the sobriquet "Venice of the East". These large networks of canals are Alleppey's lifeline. Alappuzha was one of the busiest centers of trade in the past, with one of the best-known ports along the Malabar coast. Even today it retains its charm as the center for the Coir carpet industry and prawn farming. Alappuzha, the ideal headquarters for backwater tourism, as well as for visits to the church-filled town of Kottayam and the town of Aranmula, which are known for their historic annual Aranmula Snake Boat Race. Chengannur, in Alappuzha, is the nearest railway station to Sabarimala. The Krishnapuram Palace is in Kayamkulam. The Buddha idol and Saradha Mandiram are the main attractions of Mavelikkara. The Buddha statue is in a seated posture, resembling Padmasana. A feature common to the idols is that hair has not been engraved on the head. Studies by the archaeology department have not been able to explain the absence of hair, which is common to Buddha statues of the Gandhara and Mathura traditions. The head has markings resembling headgear. Though the department has made a pagoda-like structure for the statue, no information on the idol is available to tourists who visit the area. Local people in the area light lamps before the idol. The engravings on the head resemble a helmet of Greek statues. The mark of a sacred thread is visible on the body. Another feature is the marking of a shawl on one shoulder. Here the archaeological department has put up a sign specifying the age of the statue. Saradha Mandiram was the residence of Kerala Panini.

Alappuzha is also known for its snake-boat races held on the second Saturday of August, every year. This competition; the Nehru boat race takes its name from India's first prime minister Jawaharlal Nehru, which was inaugurated in 1952. It is excitement all around as snake-boats, each manned by over a hundred oarsmen, cut through the waters like wind. The event is a tremendous success with tourists and the local population alike.

The boat cruise along the backwaters of Alappuzha gives one a first hand experience of the lifestyle; toddy tapping, fishing for small fry, Coir-making, prawn farming etc., which remains more or less unchanged over the years.

The Revi Karunakaran Memorial Museum features displays of art and artifacts. Revi Karunakaran was the architect of a modernized Coir industry that still employs more than 500,000 people in the state of Kerala. The objects displayed at the Museum were collected by his family over three generations and feature unique artistic pieces from all parts of the world.

Alappuzha, the district headquarters, is a town with picturesque canals, backwaters and lagoons, was described as the "Venice of the East" by Lord Curzon.

Kuttanadu
Kuttanad or Kuttanadu is an area of Alappuzha District, densely covered with waterways. Kuttanad is famous because of its paddy fields and farmers dedicated to the growth of paddy. It was once called the "Keralathinte Nellara", which means "rice bowl of Kerala". Factors such as expense and labor shortages affected the agriculture in this region. Many former rice fields are now used for other crops which require much lesser investment. Kuttanadu is the birthplace of the novelist Thakazhi Sivasankara Pillai.

Festivals
Chettikulangara Bharani is the most important festival in Alappuzha district. The festival is one among the important temple festivals of Kerala. A Chettikulagara Bhagavathi Temple, a temple dedicated to the Goddess Bhagavathi is about four kilometers from Mavelikkara. The festival occurs on the Bharani asterism in February/March. The main rituals of the festival are the 'Kuthiyottam' and 'Kettukazcha'. The 'Kuthiyottam' features a procession of young boys who have observed rigorous ritual penance. Traditional drums, music and glittering ornamental parasols accompany this procession of boys who dance in a trance.

The St. Andrew's Basilica, Arthunkal in Alappuzha District is noted for the annual feast, popularly known as Arthunkal Perunnal (perunnal means feast). The feast is held in December or January every year.

'Chirappu Mahotsavam' is a big occasion at Mullakkal Rajarajeswari Temple in December. Christmas comes in between the festival and Alappuzha town is a really happening place at the time. The streets are full of wandering markets and entertainment ventures like circuses and exhibitions. The streets are crowded throughout the month and there is a 'Shiveli' or the magnificent display of nine Tuskers accompanied by the 'Chenda' and the 'Panchavadyam' music.

Padanilam Sivarathri is another important religious event in Alappuzha district. This festival is held every year in the Padanilam Parabrahma Temple. The temple is situated in the small town of Padanilam. Padanilam is situated 'about 16 km from Mavelikkara town. This place can also be called the festival Village of Alappuzha because Padanilam witnesses a large number of festivals every year including vrischika mahotsavam and irupathiyetttamonam.

A grand annual festival is celebrated at the unique Nagaraja Temple (Mannarasala Temple ,Vettikodu Nagaraja Temple) in October/November. Another festival celebrated by the temple is a one-day Thaipooyan Kavadi. The Chandanakudam is celebrated at the Kidangam-Parampu Temple during December every year. Kottamkulangara Temple in Alappuzha has two festive seasons in February and March, because of the two deities with separate flag masts in the same compound wall.

The Kandamangalam Rajarajeshwari Temple is located in Kadakkarappally, Cherthala 1 km west of Thankey junction on NH 47. The annual festival comes in March–April. Chikkara, offering of children to the mother goddess during the festival, is the major attraction. The Chamanju Valathu of children starts on the 2nd day of the festival and lasts until the 8th day. Procession named Thalappoli start on the flag-hoisting day itself. The holy bath (Aarattu) of the goddess is held in a pool within the temple compound on the 10th day of festival. Elephant processions, fireworks, stage shows, etc. are major events that attract thousands of devotees and others.

The churches here celebrate grand annual feasts. The 'Arthunkal Perunnal' feast is celebrated at the Arthunkal Church. and Also, the big major Christian festivals are the festivals at Edathwa Church and Thumpoli Church. The regatta forms part of many festivals here in many places. The annual Vallam Kali (Nehru Trophy Boat Race) is held in the backwaters in the month of September associated with the Onam festival. The main attraction is the Chundan Vallam (Snake Boat) race, in which a number of contestants are in the running for the Prime Minister's trophy. Another celebration in Alappuzha is the "Beach Festival", held from 30 December to 2 January. The annual festival conducted in Champakulam "Valiya Palli" is another big festival.

Education

Colleges

Medical colleges

 Government T D Medical College, Alappuzha

Paramedical Colleges
 KVM Institute of Paramedical Science, Cherthala.

Nursing Colleges
 Government College of Nursing,Vandanam.
KVM College of Nursing,Cherthala.

Arts and Science colleges

Engineering colleges

Schools

Notable people

Photo gallery

Towns and villages
 

 Cherthala North
 Kurattikkadu
 Mazhukeer
 Padanilam
 Pathiyankara
 Poomala Chaal

See also
 Administration of Alappuzha district
 Kottayam district
 Chengannur

References

Further reading

External links

 Official website of Alappuzha District
 Alappuzha Hotels & Resorts
 Shappil House - Ancient Family in Mavelikara

 
Populated places established in 1957
Districts of Kerala
1957 establishments in Kerala